The 2016 FIFA U-20 Women's World Cup was the 8th edition of the FIFA U-20 Women's World Cup, the biennial international women's youth football championship contested by the under-20 national teams of the member associations of FIFA. The tournament was held in Papua New Guinea from 13 November to 3 December 2016. This was the first FIFA tournament held in the country.

North Korea won their 2nd title in this event by beating France in the final, 3–1. They became the first country to win the U-20 and U-17 Women's World Cup in the same year, with their under-17 team winning the 2016 FIFA U-17 Women's World Cup earlier in the year.

Host selection

Original round of bidding
The following countries submitted a bid to host the tournament by the May 2013 deadline:

South Africa were awarded the hosting rights by FIFA Executive Committee at their meeting on 5 December 2013. However, they later withdrew, giving its notice at FIFA's executive committee meeting prior to the 2014 FIFA World Cup.

Second round of bidding
After South Africa's withdrawal, the following countries announced they would be interested in hosting:

Papua New Guinea were awarded the hosting rights of the tournament by the FIFA Executive Committee on 20 March 2015.

Qualified teams
A total of 16 teams qualify for the final tournament. In addition to Papua New Guinea who qualified automatically as hosts, the other 15 teams qualify from six separate continental competitions. The slot allocation was published in June 2014.

1.Teams that will make their debut.

Venues
A FIFA delegation visited the following four stadiums in April 2015: Sir Hubert Murray Stadium, Sir John Guise Stadium, Lloyd Robson Oval (National Football Stadium), and Bava Park, all located in Port Moresby. The same four stadiums were submitted to FIFA for approval in October 2015. The final approved stadiums are:

Emblem and slogan
The official emblem and slogan ("To Inspire, To Excel") were unveiled on 8 March 2016.

Mascot
The official mascot, a bird-of-paradise nicknamed "Susa", was launched on 11 June 2016.

Theme Song
The official theme song for the 2016 FIFA U-20 Women's World cup Kumul Susa written by dAdiigii and performed by Mereani & dAdiigii

Squads

Each team must name a squad of 21 players (three of whom must be goalkeepers) by the FIFA deadline. All players must be born on or after 1 January 1996, and on or before 31 December 2000. The official squads were announced on 8 November 2016.

Match officials
A total of 16 referees, and 27 assistant referees were appointed by FIFA for the tournament.

Draw
The official draw was held on 17 March 2016, 18:30 CET (UTC+1), at the FIFA headquarters in Zürich, Switzerland. The teams were seeded based on their performances in previous U-20 Women's World Cups and confederation tournaments, with the hosts Papua New Guinea automatically seeded and assigned to position A1. Teams of the same confederation could not meet in the group stage.

Group stage
The top two teams of each group advance to the quarter-finals. The rankings of teams in each group are determined as follows:

If two or more teams are equal on the basis of the above three criteria, their rankings are determined as follows:

All times are local, PGT (UTC+10).

Group A

Group B

Group C

Group D

Knockout stage
In the knockout stages, if a match is level at the end of normal playing time, extra time is played (two periods of 15 minutes each) and followed, if necessary, by a penalty shoot-out to determine the winner, except for the third place match where no extra time is played as the match is played directly before the final.

On 18 March 2016, the FIFA Executive Committee agreed that the competition would be part of the International Football Association Board's trial to allow a fourth substitute to be made during extra time.

Quarter-finals

Semi-finals

Third place match

Final

Awards
The following awards were given for the tournament:

Goalscorers

5 goals

 Gabi Nunes
 Mami Ueno
 Stina Blackstenius

4 goals

 Yuka Momiki
 Kim So-hyang
 Ri Hyang-sim

3 goals

 Brena
 Clara Matéo
 Stefanie Sanders
 Kiana Palacios
 Jon So-yon
 Lucía García

2 goals

 Yasmim
 Delphine Cascarino
 Madeline Gier
 Yui Hasegawa
 Shiho Matsubara
 Chinwendu Ihezuo
 Ju Hyo-sim
 Kim Phyong-hwa
 Wi Jong-sim
 Mariona Caldentey
 Mallory Pugh
 Ally Watt

1 goal

 Duda
 Geyse
 Katrine
 Gabrielle Carle
 Juliane Gathrat
 Grace Geyoro
 Marie-Charlotte Léger
 Saskia Matheis
 Dina Orschmann
 Lea Schüller
 Jane Ayieyam
 Sandra Owusu-Ansah
 Honoka Hayashi
 Miyabi Moriya
 Hina Sugita
 Jacqueline Crowther
 Teresa González
 Maria Sánchez
 Tayla Christensen
 Isabella Coombes
 Joy Bokiri
 Ihuoma Onyebuchi
 Chinaza Uchendu
 Ri Un-sim
 Sung Hyang-sim
 U Sol-gyong
 Nicollete Ageva
 Han Chae-rin
 Kim Seong-mi
 Namgung Ye-ji
 Aitana Bonmati
 Nahikari García
 Patricia Guijarro
 Alba Redondo
 Anna Anvegård
 Johanna Rytting Kaneryd
 Kelcie Hedge
 Natalie Jacobs
 Ashley Sanchez
 Gabriela García
 Kika Moreno
 Mariana Speckmaier

Own goal

 Carla (against North Korea)
 Casey Murphy (against Ghana)

References

External links
FIFA U-20 Women's World Cup Papua New Guinea 2016, FIFA.com
FIFA Technical Report 

 
2016
2016 in women's association football
2016 FIFA U-20 World Cup
2016 in Papua New Guinean sport
November 2016 sports events in Oceania
December 2016 sports events in Oceania
2016 in youth association football